Truck and tractor pulling, also known as power pulling, is a form of a motorsport competition in which antique or modified tractors pull a heavy drag or sled along an ,  track, with the winner being the tractor that pulls the drag the farthest.  Tractor pulling is popular in certain areas of the United States, Mexico, Canada, Europe (especially in the United Kingdom, Greece, Switzerland, Sweden, Netherlands, Belgium, Italy, Denmark and Germany), Australia, Brazil, South Africa, Vietnam, India and New Zealand. The sport is known as the world's most powerful motorsport, due to the multi-engined modified tractor pullers.

All tractors in their respective classes pull a set weight in the drag. When a tractor gets to the end of the 100 meter track, this is known as a "full pull". When more than one tractor completes the course, more weight is added to the drag, and those competitors that moved past  will compete in a pull-off; the winner is the one who can pull the drag the farthest. The drag is known as a weight transfer drag. This means that, as it is pulled down the track, the weight is transferred (linked with gears to the drag’s wheels) from over the rear axles and towards the front of the drag. In front of the rear wheels, instead of front wheels, there is a "pan". This is essentially a metal plate, and as the weight moves toward it, the resistance between the pan and the ground builds. The farther the tractor pulls the drag, the more difficult it gets.

Tractor pulling originated from pre-Industrial Era horse pulling competitions in which farmers would compete with one another to see whose teams of draft horses could pull a heavy load over the longest distance. The first known competitions using motorized tractors were held in 1929 in Missouri and Kentucky. Tractor pulling became popular in rural areas across the Midwestern and Southern United States in the 1950s and 1960s. From there it gradually spread to Canada, Europe, and Australia and New Zealand.

History in the US
Prior to the invention of the tractor, when farm implements were pulled by horses, farmers would boast about the strength of their teams and seek to compare and contest in teams with one another to see who had the most powerful animals. In some cases, they compared horse teams pulling large loads over distance, such as a fully loaded hay cart or wagon. In other situations, a flat board or skid would have a horse or team of horses then hitched to it; weight would be added, usually in the form of rocks, and the driver would urge his horses to pull the load, with more weight added as competitors were eliminated; the animals pulling the most weight or for the greatest distance were judged the strongest. These events became the formalized sport of horse pulling, which is still carried out today with draft horses, specially bred to have high strength for pulling heavy loads. Today, fixed weights on drags  are dragged for a set distance and additional weight is added in successive rounds. While it is said that the term horsepower is derived from this event, the concept was developed earlier, in experiments and measurements performed by James Watt and Mason Worrell.

It wasn't until 1929 that motorized vehicles were put to use in the first events at Bowling Green, Missouri, and Vaughansville, Ohio. Although the sport was recognized then, it did not really become popular until the '50s and '60s. It was also realized, at that time, there were no uniform set of rules. The rules varied from state to state, county to county, and competitors never knew what standards to follow. This made the sport difficult for new entrants.

In 1969, representatives from eight states congregated to create a uniform book of rules to give the sport the much needed structure, and created the National Tractor Pullers Association (NTPA). The NTPA's early years were events that used standard farm vehicles, with the motto "Pull on Sunday, plow on Monday". Pulling remained basically the same through the '70s, with only stock and modified tractors. Stock tractors were commercially available tractors produced by manufacturers, and modified tractors were the basic tractor chassis with another non-tractor engine mounted on it.

Tractors remained single engine until two Ohio brothers, Carl and Paul Bosse, introduced the crossbox which could allow multiple engines to be attached to a single driveshaft. Other innovators during this period included Bruce Hutcherson, with his triple Rodeck engine powered "Makin Bacon Special", Dave and Ralph Banter and their Chevrolet powered tractors, and the "Mission Impossible" tractors of Tim Engler, which at one point had up to seven blown alcohol engines on board.

Subsequently, modified tractors with four engines were common, while stock tractors tried to catch up by adding multiple large turbochargers, along with intercoolers, but both retained the appearance of a tractor. Soon tractors became single-use machines that were not used on the farm, making the "Pull on Sunday, plow on Monday" motto obsolete.

Throughout the '70s and '80s the modified division continued to thrill crowds by adding more engines, and soon the tractors lost their tractor appearance and turned into high 'spec' dragsters. The limit was reached in 1988 when a tractor with seven engines was built. As well as piston engines, turbine engines (frequently mistakenly called "jet engines") appeared in 1974, with Gardner Stone's "General" Tractor a four-turboshaft unit hitting the hook in 1989.

The growing popularity of the sport caused the creation of a new four-wheel drive division in 1976, which captured a large fan base. Today the 4-wheel drive division is one of the most popular with the success of trucks like the Holman Brothers "4-Play" Chevy and Bob Boden's "Studley Studebaker".

Two-wheel-drive (2WD) truck class
The two-wheel drive (2WD) division was introduced in 1983.

Alcohol methane engines with up to eight cylinders are permitted, but diesel engines are not. Any wheelbase is permitted.

They permit tubular steel frames. The ground patch is not to exceed  on original tread.

Super stock, pro-stock, and mini-modified
Super Stock tractor Open class uses primarily methanol fuel (some are diesel versions). Super Stock Open and Super Stock Diesel tractors may use up to four turbochargers in three stages. However, a true Open (methanol fuel) tractor is not allowed to compete in the Diesel class.

Diesel Pro Stock Tractors are limited to one turbocharger and diesel fuel is the only allowable source for power, in keeping with the 'spirit' of the original tractors. There is now a class called Limited Pro Stock that is limited to  engine and  turbocharger.

The latest addition to Pro Stocks is the Light Pro Stock Class that typically pulls  depending on location. These tractors are limited to  engines but can run any size turbo. The light overall weight makes this a driver's class as significant skill is required to keep the tractor on the track.

The mini-modified class is a highly specialized and custom built tractor to be fitted with a naturally aspirated engine, at minimum. With the driver, they weigh only . Their reputation is known as the wildest ride in pulling, as naturally it is a very high horsepower to weight ratio. Whereas, their larger counterparts, the Modifieds, will weigh , utilizing the same engine that a Mini has, but, with multiple powerplants per custom built tractor chassis. Usually, a maximum of five engines is all that will make the  weight limit. Nitromethane and oxidizers were outlawed in 1976.

Antique tractor pulling 

Antique tractor pulling is how tractor pulling first got started (although the tractors were just modern tractors at that time). As early as 1929, farmers began attaching their tractors to drags, and dragging it down a field to see who could pull it the furthest. People who were event organizers at Bowling Green, Missouri and Vaughansville, Ohio found out farmers were doing this and that it drew spectators. By 1950, county fairs across the country started featuring tractor pulls. Spectators found it fascinating to see machines that would “Pull on Sunday, plow on Monday”. At first competitors would use a ‘Human Drag’, meaning a drag that was weighted by humans, different people would be added as the tractor made it down the track. However, organizers began to look at different ways to add weight to the drag, as spectators walking on the drag while moving proved to be a hazard. In the late 60s, a weight-exchanging drag was created, the drag that was created was basically a flatbed truck trailer with wheels near the back and a drag at the front. A mass that is moveable of up to 65,000 pounds or 29,000 kilograms, the mass starts at the back of the sled, slowly working its way up to the top as the drag moves down the track.

The tractors are divided into different weight classes based on the tractor weight, the weight classes starting at 2,500 and ending at 14,000 pounds. The tractors could go in any class they choose, with many adding weight for the higher weighted classes. In order to be able to compete in Antique tractor pull competitions a tractor must perform at its original speed. Some pulling competitions will have a ‘dyno’, connecting the PTO shaft on the tractor to a dynamometer to test the horsepower. If a tractor shows it has more horsepower than the original tractor is supposed to have, it is placed into an alternate class called ‘Modified Tractors’.

The hitching device can be no more than  round stock ( square), or less than  round stock ( square), the hole has to be  diameter. All the weights on a tractor must be fixed. All drivers when pulling must remain seated.

History in Australia

The first Australian Tractor Pull was held at the Elmore Field Days (Victoria) in 1976. The following year saw Tractor Pulling begin in the Victorian rural town of Quambatook.  It has developed over the years into a highly competitive and technical sport, where the difference between first and last place may be as small as one or two metres. Often the top tractors are separated by mere centimetres.
 
The Australian Tractor Pullers Association (ATPA) is a non-profit organisation that governs Tractor Pulling in Australia. Our events (Tractor Pulls) are held in conjunction with a promoter. This is often a local school, sporting, service or community club (for example; Apex, Rotary, Lions, Netball, Cricket, Football) who use the event as a fundraiser. Tractor Pulls are held in locations throughout Australia, predominantly in Victoria, South Australia and New South Wales. In the west the Western Australian Tractor Pullers Association (WATPA) runs events and is affiliated with the ATPA.
 
The ATPA is focused on actively promoting this spectacular sport and working with communities to not only establish a unique annual event, but more importantly to assist communities financially through the influx of spectators, sponsors and promotion.

The tractors are divided into classes and comply with either "Limited" or "Open" rules. The classes are Open Modified, Super Modified, Limited Modified, Open Mini Modified, Mini Modified, Pro Stock (diesel) and Two Wheel Drive Trucks. The distinction between classes is determined by the overall maximum weight, engine modifications, fuels and physical size.

Competition is open to both women and men, the only restriction being that competitors must at least hold a current Learner Driver’s Permit. It sometimes comes down to members of the same family competing for the trophies.

The Junior Modified Pulling Association conducts an "introductory" class for 8- to 16-year-olds to develop driving, mechanical and competitive skills.  The Modified Mowers pull their own smaller version of the big sled.

Drag pulling

In the early days two main techniques were used. Either a dead weight of fixed mass was dragged, or the step-on method was used, where people stood at fixed positions and stepped aboard as the drag passed. Another rule which has now been dropped was that a speed limit should be observed because of injuries resulting from the increased speed at which they boarded.

Upon starting, all the weights are over the drag's rear axles, to give an effective weight of the drag plus zero. As the tractor travels the course, the weights are pushed forward off the drag's axles, pushing the front of the drag into the ground, synthetically creating a gain in weight until the tractor is no longer able to overcome the force of friction. Most drags have grouser bars that act like teeth and dig into the soil to stop the sled.

Engines 
Apart from modified standard diesel tractors, a variety of high power engines are used in tractor pulling, which started in the late 1970s. In the early years, mainly single, double or multiple US-made big block dragster engines were used, but nowadays, a lot of parts from discarded military machinery are in use, like Klimov TV3-117 (Isotov) turboshafts from Russian helicopters, Soviet Zvezda M503 torpedo boat engines, Continental AV1790 tank engines, or World-War-2-era aircraft piston engines in V12-shape (e.g. Rolls-Royce Griffon) or as radial engines (e.g. Curtiss-Wright R-3350). Due to the limited number of vintage warbird engines remaining, some organisations that own them, such as the Fantasy of Flight museum in Florida, refuse to sell engines from their collection to customers that wish to use them for tractor pulling. In recent years a number of agricultural engines have been converted to run on methanol with multi-stage turbocharging.

References

Sources
Origins of horse pulling
History of tractor/power pulling and sled technology
the rules of tractor/power pulling
United Pullers of the Carolinas

External links

 
Tractors
Sports entertainment
Articles containing video clips